Robby Ginepri was the defending champion, but did not participate.

Greg Rusedski won the title, defeating Alexander Popp 7–6(7–5), 7–6(7–2) in the final.

Seeds

Draw

Finals

Top half

Bottom half

References

Main Draw

Hall of Fame Tennis Championships - Singles
2004 Hall of Fame Tennis Championships